Fatima Al Zahraa Khachab (born 22 July 1999) is a Lebanese former footballer who played as a midfielder.

Club career 
Khachab was first interested in football during a school PE session. She joined Ansar's FAME youth academy aged 12; despite being only for boys, she was allowed to participate. Two years later, she joined Stars Association for Sports (SAS). After three seasons at SAS, she played one year each at Girls Football Academy (GFA) and Zouk Mosbeh, before moving to Beirut Football Academy (BFA) in 2019.

International career 
Khachab first began training with Lebanon U19 aged 14. She was later called up to the U17 team at the 2015 Arab U-17 Women's Cup, helping Lebanon win gold. Khachab was called up to the senior team for the 2019 WAFF Championship, finishing in third place.

Personal life 
Khachab has a degree in physical education.

Honours
Lebanon U17
 Arab U-17 Women's Cup: 2015

Lebanon
 WAFF Women's Championship third place: 2019

See also
 List of Lebanon women's international footballers

References

External links
 
 

1999 births
Living people
Footballers from Beirut
Lebanese women's footballers
Women's association football midfielders
Stars Association for Sports players
Girls Football Academy players
Zouk Mosbeh SC footballers
Beirut Football Academy players
Lebanese Women's Football League players
Lebanon women's youth international footballers
Lebanon women's international footballers